Johnstone is a surname. It is a variant of the similar surname Johnston which in most cases is a habitational surname derived from several places in Scotland.

Etymology

The habitational surname Johnstone / Johnston is in most cases derived from the name of Johnstone located in Annandale, Dumfriesshire, Scotland.  This surname is derived from the genitive case of the given name John and tone or toun ("settlement" in Middle English; tun in Old English), literally meaning "John's town". There are several similar place names in Scotland, including the city of Perth, which was once known as St. John's Toun. This and other similarly named locations may also be sources for the habitational surnames Johnstone / Johnston.

List of persons with the surname

17th century
 James Johnstone, 1st Earl of Hartfell (1602–1653)
 James Johnstone, 2nd Marquess of Annandale (c.1687–1730)
 Sir James Johnstone, 3rd Baronet (1697–1772), Scottish baronet and politician
 Dr. John Johnstone (1661–1732), 32nd Mayor of New York City
 William Johnstone, 1st Marquess of Annandale (1664–1721), Scottish nobleman
 Sir William Johnstone, 2nd Baronet (1600s–1727), Scottish baronet and politician

18th century
 Charles Johnstone (c. 1719–1800), Irish novelist
 Chevalier de Johnstone (1719 – c. 1791), army officer
 Edward Huggins Johnstone (1791–1850), Senior Judge of the United States District Court for the Western District of Kentucky
 George Johnstone, 3rd Marquess of Annandale (1720–1792)
 George Johnstone (1730–1787), British naval officer and Member of Parliament
 George Johnstone (1764–1813), British politician
 Sir James Johnstone, 4th Baronet (1726–1794)
 James Johnstone (c. 1759–1823) British naval officer, acting lieutenant during George Vancouver’s 1791–95 expedition
 John Johnstone (1734–1795), Scottish nabob
 Thomas Johnstone (1772–1839), sailor, smuggler and saboteur
 William Johnstone (1729–1805), Scottish advocate, landowner and politician

19th century
 Sir Alan Johnstone (1858–1932), British diplomat
 Archie Johnstone (1896-1963), Scottish journalist who defected to the Soviet Union; husband of Nancy Johnstone
 Banner Johnstone (1882–1964), British rower
 Barbara Elizabeth Johnstone (1849–1928), English burlesque performer and opera bouffe soprano
 Edward Grahame Johnstone (1899–1946), British World War I flying ace
 Harcourt Johnstone (1895–1945), British Liberal Party politician
 Henry James Johnstone (1835–1907), British portrait photographer and landscape painter in Australia
 James Johnstone (1801–1888), Scottish Liberal Party politician
 John Johnstone (1869–1953), Scottish footballer
 Joseph Johnstone (1860–1931), Scottish Liberal politician
 Justine Johnstone (1895–1982), American actress and pathologist
 Lamar Johnstone (1882–1919), American actor and director
 Ralph Johnstone (1886–1910), American aviator who died in an air crash
 Susan Johnstone (1792-1850), British actress
 William Johnstone (VC) (1823–1857), British soldier, recipient of the Victoria Cross

20th century
 Alex Johnstone (1961–2016), Scottish politician
 Alison Johnstone (born 1965), Scottish politician
 Arthur H. Johnstone, South African scouting official
 Anne Grahame Johnstone (1928–1998), illustrator
 Anthony "Tony" Johnstone (born 1956), Zimbabwean professional golfer
 Archibald Johnstone (1924-2014), Canadian businessman and retired Senator
 Billy Johnstone, Australian rugby player
 Bobby Johnstone (1929–2001), Scottish footballer
 Brad Johnstone (born 1950), New Zealand rugby union footballer and coach
 Bruce Johnstone (born 1943), American musician 
 Bruce Johnstone (1937–2022), South African Formula One race car driver
 Campbell Johnstone (born 1980), All Black, New Zealand Rugby Player 
 Chris Johnstone (born 1960)
 Colin Johnstone, (1921–1991) New Zealander rower
 Davey Johnstone (born 1951), rock guitarist and vocalist
 Derek Johnstone (born 1953), Scottish footballer
 Diana Johnstone (born 1934), American political writer
 Dougie Johnstone (born 1969), Scottish footballer
 Ed Johnstone (born 1954), Canadian ice hockey player
 Edward Huggins Johnstone (1922-2013), American federal judge
 Eve Johnstone, (born 1944) Scottish Head of the Division of Psychiatry at the University of Edinburgh
 Frederick Johnston (disambiguation)
 Gavin Wildridge Johnstone (1941–1987), Australian ornithologist
 Graeme Johnstone, Australian state coroner for Victoria
 Gwyneth Johnstone (1915–2010), English landscape painter
 Harry Johnstone, English footballer
 James Johnstone (disambiguation)
 Janet Johnstone (1928–1979), illustrator
 Jay Johnstone (1946–2020), American baseball player
 John Johnstone (baseball) (born 1968), former Major League Baseball player
 Jude Johnstone,  American singer-songwriter
 Keith Johnstone (born 1933), American drama instructor
 Lance Johnstone (born 1973), American football player
 Lew Johnstone (1916–1983), Australian politician
 Mandy Johnstone (born 1972), Australian politician
 Marty Johnstone (1951–1979), New Zealand drug trafficker
 Nancy Johnstone (1906-1951), English writer and humanitarian, wife of Archie Johnstone
 Nathan Johnstone (born 1990), Australian snowboarder
 Parker Johnstone (born 1961), American race car driver
 Paul Neil Milne Johnstone (1952–2004), British poet
 Peter Johnstone (1922–1977), New Zealand rugby player
 Peter Johnstone (born 1944), former governor of Anguilla)
 Peter Tennant Johnstone (born 1948), British mathematician
 Phil Johnstone, songwriter, keyboardist, guitarist and record producer
 Sam Johnstone (born 1993), English footballer
 Sandy Johnstone (1916–2000), British Air Marshal
 Travis Johnstone (born 1980), Australian rules footballer
 Tyler Johnstone (born 1992), American football player
 William Johnstone (1908–1996), American actor 
 William W. Johnstone (1938–2004), American author of novels about the Old West

Scottish clan
Clan Johnstone, a Scottish clan, whose chief has the noble title Earl of Annandale and Hartfell

People with a variant form of the surname
 William Johnstone Milne (1892–1917), Canadian World War I soldier 
 William Johnstone Ritchie (1813 – 92), Chief Justice of the Canadian Supreme Court
 George Johnstone Stoney (1826–1911), Irish physicist; introduced the term "electron"

Fictional people with the surname
 Paul Johnstone, alter-ego of the anti-hero Shadowhawk

See also
Johnston (surname)

References

English-language surnames